Belwood can refer to:
Belwood, North Carolina 
Belwood, Ontario

See also
 Bellwood (disambiguation)
 Beltwood House, London